Petersburg High School (PHS) is the public high school for the Southeast Alaskan community of Petersburg and the Petersburg City School District. The current principal is Rick Dormer.

Extracurriculars

Petersburg is a class 2A school according to the Alaska School Activities Association. It offers:

 Cross country
 Swim and dive
 Volleyball
 Wrestling
 Basketball
 Track and field
 Music/Pep band
 Drama
 Cheerleading
 Baseball

History
The following information was gathered for a school project and is missing parts. Please add to the article if you have any additional information. Thanks.
This is a timeline- some dates are unknown.

School classes were first held for Petersburg children in the mess hall of Icicle Seafoods from 1904-'05. It is unknown where school was held from 1906 to 1913.
In 1913 a schoolhouse was built at an unknown location.
In the 1920s high schools in the US started to include grades 9–12, before the 1920s public school only was held for grades 1–8.
1927 was the year that held the first graduating class of Petersburg. The class consisted of Ruby Rayner, Alma Cornstad (valedictorian), Julia Wasvick, and Fred Nelson. The first known superintendent was C. H. Bowman, who held the position from 1927 to at least 1936.
In 1931 a gym was built with a shop on the second floor.
The current middle school was built in the 1940s- was high school until 1985
The Stedman Elementary school was built in 1968.
In 1985 the current high school was built.

Notable State Championships are-

2A Boys Basketball Champs 2016

2A Boys Basketball Champs 2017

2A Girls Cross Country Champs 2017

See also
 List of high schools in Alaska

References

External links
 

Buildings and structures in Petersburg Borough, Alaska
Educational institutions in the United States with year of establishment missing
Public high schools in Alaska